This is a list of awards and nominations received by American actor and producer Alessandro Nivola.

Awards and nominations

Black Film Critics Circle Awards

Blockbuster Entertainment Awards

British Independent Film Awards

Central Ohio Film Critics Association

Drama Desk Award

Georgia Film Critics Association

Gold Derby Awards

Independent Spirit Awards

New York Film Critics Online

Provincetown International Film Festival

San Diego Film Critics Society

Screen Actors Guild Award

Seattle Film Critics Awards

Tony Award

Tribeca Film Festival

Washington D.C. Area Film Critics Association

References

External links
 

Lists of awards received by American actor